Alexander Cole Mighten (born 11 April 2002) is a professional footballer who plays as a winger for Nottingham Forest. Born in the United States, he represents England at the youth international level.

Club career
Mighten came up with the Nottingham Forest academy, appearing for the club's Under-18 team. Mighten joined Forest in 2009 after previously playing for Arnold Town. During his development, Mighten received support from former Forest players Des Walker and David Johnson.

On 24 September 2019, Mighten made his professional debut when he appeared as a 78th-minute substitute during a 5–0 loss in an EFL Cup fixture against Arsenal. He then made his first start for the Reds on 5 January 2020 in a 2–0 loss to Chelsea in an FA Cup match, Mighten impressed in the game, winning a penalty for Forest only for it to be ruled out by a marginal VAR decision.

On 24 August 2020, Mighten signed a new contract extension keeping him at the club until June 2025. He scored his first professional goal in a 1–1 draw against Millwall on 19 December.

On 29 August, Mighten joined Sheffield Wednesday on a season-long loan. He made his debut a day later against Bradford City in the EFL Trophy playing 80 minutes. His first goal came against Morecambe in the FA Cup. He returned to Nottingham Forest on 10 January 2023 having played 14 times and scoring two goals.

International career
Mighten has represented England at under-15 through to under-19 level. Mighten received his first call-up to the under-19 squad in March 2021. On 6 September 2021, Mighten made his debut for the England under-20 side in a 6–1 victory over Romania at St. George's Park. As Mighten was born in Hartford, Connecticut, United States, he is also eligible to represent the United States.

Personal
Alex's brother, David, plays college soccer at Medaille College in Buffalo, New York. Alex was born in Hartford, Connecticut, United States, while his father, Eddie Mighten, worked for ESPN. His family returned to Nottingham, England when he was 3 years old.

Career statistics

Club

Honours
Nottingham Forest
EFL Championship play-offs: 2022

References

External links
Profile at the Nottingham Forest F.C. website

2002 births
Living people
People from West Hartford, Connecticut
English footballers
England youth international footballers
American soccer players
American emigrants to England
Association football midfielders
Nottingham Forest F.C. players
People educated at West Bridgford School
Soccer players from Connecticut
English Football League players
Premier League players
Footballers from Nottingham